The 2003–04 season is FC Vaslui's 2nd season of its existence, and its 1st in Divizia B. After Marius Stan, went to Poli Unirea Iaşi, the new president was Teofil Iordachi, but he resigned only after one week. Soon after, Dragoş Iftime was named the new president. Even if Adrian Porumboiu announced that he retires from sponsoring FC Vaslui, he still was helping the team in the new season. The new manager was named Gigi Ion, and the objective was to avoid relegation. FC Vaslui started the season with a victory against the archrival, Poli Unirea Iaşi 1-0. The team continued with some great performances, and so the objective, from avoiding relegation, changed to promote in Divizia A. In November, Gigi Ion had a conflict with the president, and after the 15th Matchday, he was dismissed, even the team finished 2nd. In the second part of the season, 3 managers trained the team, the last one Ioan Sdrobiş, staying until the end of the season. Also, Sdrobiş trained the team in the previous season, having some great performances. At the end of the season, FC Vaslui finished 2nd, with 12 points less than Poli Unirea Iaşi.

Squad 
As of 30 May 2004

Statistics

Appearances and goals
Last updated on 30 May 2004.

|-
|colspan="12"|Players sold or loaned out during the season
|-

|}

Top scorers

Top assists

Disciplinary record

Divizia B

League table

Results by round

Results summary

Matches

Cupa României

FC Vaslui seasons
Vaslui